Suinoorda is a genus of moths of the family Crambidae. It contains only one species, Suinoorda maccabei, which is found on the Bahamas.

References

Odontiinae
Crambidae genera